Netflix is an American global Internet streaming-on-demand media provider that has distributed a number of original streaming television shows, including original series, specials, miniseries, and documentaries and films. Netflix's original productions also include continuations of canceled series from other networks, as well as licensing or co-producing content from international broadcasters for exclusive broadcast in other territories, which is also branded in those regions as Netflix original content. Netflix previously produced content through Red Envelope Entertainment. The company has since increased its original content. All programming is in English unless stated otherwise, is organized by its primary genre or format, and is sorted by premiere date. These shows had their original production commissioned by Netflix, or had additional seasons commissioned by Netflix.

Drama

Comedy

Kids & family

Animation

Adult animation

Anime

Kids & family

Non-English language scripted
These shows are created by Netflix and are spoken entirely or almost entirely in a non-English language. Most have the option of watching with English subtitles and dub.

Arabic

Danish

French

German

Hindi

Italian

Japanese

Korean

Mandarin

Polish

Portuguese

Spanish

Swedish

Turkish

Other

Unscripted

Docuseries

Reality

Variety

Co-productions
These shows have been commissioned by Netflix in cooperation with a partner network.

Continuations
These shows have been picked up by Netflix for additional seasons after having aired previous seasons on another network.

Specials

These are one-time original events or episodic supplementary content related to original TV shows.

Regional original programming
These shows are originals, because Netflix commissioned or acquired them and had their premiere on the service, but they are not available in all Netflix territories.

Continuations

Upcoming original programming
The following projects have all received series orders from Netflix or are in development, but do not have a specific release date known at this time.

Drama

Comedy

Animation

Adult animation

Anime

Kids & family

Non-English language scripted

Dutch

French

German

Hindi

Indonesian

Italian

Japanese

Korean

Mandarin

Polish

Portuguese

Spanish

Swedish

Thai

Turkish

Unscripted

Docuseries

Reality

Co-productions

Continuations

Specials

In development

Notes

References

External links
Netflix Originals current list on Netflix (based on geolocation)

 
Netflix
Netflix